Glenn Vernice Cunningham (August 4, 1909 – March 10, 1988) was an American middle-distance runner, and was considered the greatest American miler of all time. He received the James E. Sullivan Award as the top amateur athlete in the United States in 1933.

Early life
Cunningham was born in Atlanta, Kansas and grew up in Elkhart, Kansas. When he was eight years old, his legs were very badly burned in an explosion caused by his brother accidentally putting gasoline instead of kerosene in the can at his school. His brother Floyd, 13, died in the fire. When the doctors recommended amputating Glenn's legs, he was so distressed his parents would not allow it. The doctors predicted he might never walk normally again. He had lost all the flesh on his knees and shins and all the toes on his left foot. Also, his transverse arch was practically destroyed. However, his great determination, coupled with hours upon hours of a new type of therapy, enabled him to gradually regain the ability to walk and to proceed to run. It was in the early summer of 1919 when he first tried to walk again, roughly two years after the accident. He had a positive attitude as well as a strong religious faith. His favorite Bible verse was Isaiah 40:31: "But those who wait on the Lord shall renew their strength; they shall mount up with wings like eagles, they shall run and not be weary, they shall walk and not faint."

Accomplishments

Cunningham competed in the 1500 m event at the 1932 and 1936 Summer Olympics and finished fourth and second, respectively. While on the ship, traveling from the U.S. to Germany in 1936, he was voted "Most Popular Athlete" by his fellow Olympians.

Cunningham won the Sullivan medal in 1933 for his achievements in middle-distance running. In 1934, he set the world record for the mile run at 4:06.8, which stood for three years. He also set world records in the 800 m in 1936 and in the indoor mile in 1938. Also in 1938, Cunningham set a personal best time in the mile run at 4:04.4 testing Dartmouth College's Alumni Gymnasium indoor track, engineered to allow faster times than most indoor facilities. This time was not accepted as a world record, however, because Dartmouth had provided Cunningham pacing runners, which was against the rules at the time.

Cunningham's unachieved goal was a four-minute mile, a goal attempted and unmet by many other runners. Several theorists proclaimed it was impossible physiologically for humans. Some athletes tried running steady and fast-paced the whole time. Others tried to go steady for the first half then give it all they had. Glenn worried about the strength of his legs burned in his youth, so he started slow – running in the pack. He would be fresher in the second half – and would almost be sprinting the last 100 yards to the finish.

Cunningham has a park named after him in his hometown of Elkhart, Kansas.  The mile run at the Kansas Relays is named in his honor. In 1974 he was inducted into the National Track and Field Hall of Fame.

Retirement
Cunningham earned a master's degree from the University of Iowa and a PhD from New York University. After retiring from competitions in 1940 he served as director of physical education at Cornell College in Iowa for four years. Later he opened the Glenn Cunningham Youth Ranch in Kansas, where he and his wife helped 10,000 needy and abused children.

References

External links

American Miler, Paul J. Kiell, M.D., p. 105
 
Cunningham and coach Hargiss at KU

1909 births
1988 deaths
American male middle-distance runners
Athletes (track and field) at the 1932 Summer Olympics
Athletes (track and field) at the 1936 Summer Olympics
Olympic silver medalists for the United States in track and field
World record setters in athletics (track and field)
People from Cowley County, Kansas
Cornell College faculty
James E. Sullivan Award recipients
Medalists at the 1936 Summer Olympics
People from Elkhart, Kansas
20th-century American people